Gregory Peebles (died October 14, 2013) was an American tennis player.

Peebles grew up in Hawaii, where he topped the junior tennis rankings. In 1973 he qualified for the main draw of the 1973 Wimbledon Championships as a lucky loser and was beaten in the first round by West German Karl Meiler.

References

External links
 
 

Year of birth missing
2013 deaths
American male tennis players
Tennis people from Hawaii